The 2006 Philippine Basketball Association (PBA) rookie draft was an event in which teams drafted players from the amateur ranks. The draft was held at the Market! Market! in Taguig on August 20, 2006.

The Sta. Lucia Realtors choose Kelly Williams of Oakland University and from Magnolia in the PBL as the first overall pick. The players who applied for the draft underwent a week long rookie camp overseen by assistant coaches from five PBA teams.

Round 1

Round 2

Welcoat carry-over amateurs

Welcoat carried over three amateurs from its Philippine Basketball League team. They are:

Undrafted players
Draftee's name followed by college. All undrafted players become Rookie free agents.
 John Paul Alcaraz from (Letran)
 Jonathan Aldave from (Letran)
Signed by  Talk 'N Text Phone Pals as a free agent for the 2006-07 PBA season.
 Richard Alonzo from (Adamson)
Signed by Purefoods Tender Juicy Giants as a free agent for the 2008-09 PBA season.
 Ronnie Bughao from (San Beda)
Signed by Sta. Lucia Realtors as a free agent for the 2006-07 PBA season.
 Ryan Cristobal from (San Beda)
 Dennis Daa from (Las Piñas College)
Signed by Sta. Lucia as a free agent for the 2007-08 PBA season.
 Erian Daja from (West Negros)
 Ariel de Castro from (NU)
 Don Dulay from (El Camino)
Signed by Welcoat Dragons as a free agent for the 2007-08 PBA season.
 Alfie Grijaldo from (NU)
 Bob Ilanga from (U of Mindanao)
 Marlon Kalaw from (MLQU)
 Chico Lanete from (Lyceum)
Signed by Purefoods Tender Juicy Giants as a free agent for the 2007-08 PBA season.
 Jerome Paterno from (San Beda)
 Glenn Perseveranda from (Solano)
 Paul Reguera from (UE)
 Frederick Rodriguez from (Letran)
Signed by Burger King Whoppers as a free agent for the 2008-09 PBA season Fiesta Cup.
 Denver Roque from (San Sebastian)
 Robert Sanz from (PCU)
Signed by Purefoods Tender Juicy Giants as a free agent for the 2007-08 PBA season.
 Alexander Sibug from (Dominican College (New York)
 Nilo Sta. Cruz from (Letran)
 Erwin Sta. Maria from (Mapua)
 Nicole Uy from (San Sebastian)
 Al Vergara from (St. Francis)
Signed by Purefoods Tender Juicy Giants as a free agent for the 2008-09 PBA season Fiesta Cup.
 Orvie Vidad from (Newham)

Players scrapped from the list
Fil-Ams Rob Reyes and Joe Devance were scrapped from the list of rookie hopefuls after failing to submit their requirements even after PBA Commissioner Noli Eala extended the deadline of submission to August 13, 2006. The previous deadline was set on July 31.

Also, Christopher Apaitan of Mindanao State University was struck off the list after not showing in the recently held rookie camp. De La Salle guard John Quioc withdrew from the draft.

Note
*All aspirants are Filipinos until proven otherwise.

References

External links
 PBA.ph

Philippine Basketball Association draft
draft